The Man Who Wasn't There is a 1937 mystery detective novel by Anthony Gilbert, the pen name of British writer Lucy Beatrice Malleson. It is the second in her long-running series featuring the unscrupulous London solicitor and detective Arthur Crook.

Synopsis
Marjorie Hyde, a beautiful actress, stands accused of murdering her very jealous husband Major Hyde by poisoning his glass of port after dinner. However Arthur Crook and his associates set out to clear her name.

References

Bibliography
 Magill, Frank Northen . Critical Survey of Mystery and Detective Fiction: Authors, Volume 2. Salem Press, 1988.
Murphy, Bruce F. The Encyclopedia of Murder and Mystery. Springer, 1999.
 Reilly, John M. Twentieth Century Crime & Mystery Writers. Springer, 2015.

1937 British novels
British mystery novels
British thriller novels
Novels by Anthony Gilbert
Novels set in London
British detective novels
Collins Crime Club books